Catamachilis is a genus of the family Machilidae which belongs to the insect order Archaeognatha (jumping bristletails). They mostly occur in Spain.

Accepted species
Catamachilis amara Janetschek, 1954
Catamachilis ancorata Stach, 1930
Catamachilis clipeata Stach, 1930
Catamachilis constricta (Navas, 1905)
Catamachilis franzi Janetschek, 1954

References

Archaeognatha
Insects of Europe
Taxa named by Filippo Silvestri